Graham Sydney Ogden is an Old Testament scholar who served as Translations Consultant with the United Bible Societies.  Ogden contributed to the scholarly journals through his research and his writings began appearing in The Bible Translator, Journal of Biblical Literature, Journal for the Study of the Old Testament, Vetus Testamentum and other journals.

United Bible Societies
Ogden joined the United Bible Societies in 1985 and oversaw the translations in the Asia-Pacific region.  As part of his visits to India, Ogden used visit the Bible Society of India, Bangalore liaising with John Philipose, G. D. V. Prasad and Jonadob Nathaniel, the successive Translations incharges and oversee the translation/revision projects of the Bible Society of India in Bengali, Gujarati, Odiya, and Telugu.  Ogden also used to visit the Bible Society of India Andhra Pradesh Auxiliary in Secunderabad liaising with Rev. G. Babu Rao, the Coordinator of the Telugu language Old Testament Common Language Translation project of the Bible Society of India and a former study companion of Basil Rebera at the United Theological College, Bangalore.

As Translation Consultant with the United Bible Societies, Ogden took up translation of the Bible into Troko, Amis, Yami, Bunun, Paiwan, Tayal, and Hakka Chinese. Ogden is a graduate of both Japanese (Tokyo) and Mandarin (Taipei) Language Schools.

During Ogden's stint with the United Bible Societies, he worked closely with Basil Rebera, his colleague and Translations Consultant.

Writings
Ogden has contributed to the study of the Old Testament and acknowledges the influence of senior Old Testament Scholars, Norman Porteous and Bernard Anderson.

Commentaries
 1987, A Promise of Hope- a Call to Obedience: A Commentary on the Books of Joel and Malachi,

Books
1975, The Tob-Spruch in Qoheleth : its function and significance as a criterion for isolating and identifying aspects of Qoheleth's thought,
 1978, Moses and Cyrus,
 1997, A Handbook on Ecclesiastes,
 1998, A Handbook on Song of Songs,
 2007, Qoheleth, 
 2011, Isaiah,

Articles
 1979, Qoheleth's Use of the 'Nothing is Better'-Form,
 1982, Prophetic oracles against foreign nations and Psalms of communal lament: the relationship of Psalm 137 to Jeremiah 49:7-22 and Obadiah,
 1983, Qoheleth XI 1-6,
 1983, Joel 4 and Prophetic Responses to National Laments,
 1984, The Mathematics of Wisdom: Qoheleth IV 1-12,
 1984, Qoheleth XI 7-XIII 8: Qoheleth's Summons to Enjoyment and Reflection,
 1986, The Interpretation of dor in Ecclesiastes 1:4,<ref>Graham S. Ogden, The Interpretation of dor in Ecclesiastes 1:4, Journal for the Study of the Old Testament, Volume 34, 1986, pp.91-92.  Cited in Martin A. Shields, The End of Wisdom: A Reappraisal of the Historical and Canonical Function of Ecclesiastes, Eisenbrauns, Winona Lake, Indiana, 2006, p.127.  </ref>
 1988, The Use of Figurative Language in Malachi 2:10-16,
 1996, Jotham's Fable: its structure and function in Judges 9, 
 1997, The 'Better'-Probert (tob-Spruch), Rhetorical Criticism, and Qoheleth,
 2003, Literary Allusions in Isaiah: Isaiah 44:28-45:13 Revisited, 
 2004, Temporal Idioms in Isaiah 16.14; 21.16; and 23.15, 
 2004, Rev. Euan McG. Fry, 
 2004, The relationship between Isaiah 33.14b-16 and Psalm 15.1-5,
 2005, Translator training in the UBS Asia-Pacific region,
 2009, Note: An Exegetical Issue in Isaiah 16.14,
 2010, Isaiah 24: A Case of Form over Content?,

References

1938 births
Old Testament scholars
Australian Christian theologians
Linguists from Australia
Australian translation scholars
Australian priests
20th-century translators
Living people
Australian translators
Princeton Theological Seminary alumni
University of Sydney alumni
Moore Theological College alumni
Alumni of the University of London
Alumni of St John's College, Durham